Dry Branch is a stream in Washington County in the U.S. state of Missouri. It is a tributary of Indian Creek.

Dry Branch was named for the fact it often runs dry.

See also
List of rivers of Missouri

References

Rivers of Washington County, Missouri
Rivers of Missouri